Uaxactun Airport  is an airstrip in the village of Uaxactun, Guatemala.

The airstrip may be closed.

See also
 
 
 Transport in Guatemala
 List of airports in Guatemala

References

Airports in Guatemala
Petén Department